Hôtel des Monnaies (French) or Munthof (Dutch) is a Brussels Metro station on the southern segment of lines 2 and 6. It is located under the Small Ring (Brussels' inner ring road), near Saint Peter's Hospital, in the municipality of Saint-Gilles, south of the City of Brussels, Belgium. One of its entrances is on the /, after which it is named, and where Belgian currency used to be minted. 

The station opened on 2 October 1988. During the construction, work on the metro tunnels ran up against the foundations of Brussels' old city walls, which ran  beneath ground level. These walls now form part of the station.

External links

Brussels metro stations
Railway stations opened in 1988
City of Brussels